St Giles Shopping Centre is located in Elgin Town Centre, Scotland.

The Centre has two floors, an upper floor which houses some retailers like New Look, W H Smith and Waterstone’s, while the lower floor acts as the food court with Mathiesons and Subway being dominant here. A glass lift operates between the floors.

The Centre is supported with an adjacent car park with a top floor and access. A maximum of 20 retailers are located in the Centre, as well as toilets and baby changing facilities.

Buildings and structures in Moray